Palpares sobrinus is a species of antlion in the family Myrmeleontidae. It is found in southern Africa.

Description 
Palpares sobrinus is a relatively large antlion; wing length is about 5 cm. The very broad wings are mottled dark brown. Males have long appendages at the end of the abdomen.

Distribution 
This species is fairly common in grassland in north-eastern South Africa. It has also been recorded in Namibia, Botswana and Zimbabwe.

Gallery

References 

Myrmeleontidae
Insects of South Africa
Insects described in 1911